Rocky Pond is an  pond in the Myles Standish State Forest in Plymouth, Massachusetts. The pond is located south of Curlew Pond.

There is another Rocky Pond, which is better known as Big Rocky Pond, within Plymouth's borders in the West Wind Shores neighborhood.

External links
Environmental Protection Agency
MassWildlife pond map and info

Ponds of Plymouth, Massachusetts
Ponds of Massachusetts